rbw or RBW may refer to:

 "Red Blooded Woman", a 2004 single by Australian pop/dance singer Kylie Minogue
 a widely used acronym for US District Court Judge Reggie B. Walton
 Relativistic Breit–Wigner distribution, a probability distribution that models resonances in high-energy physics
 Resolution Bandwidth, electronic signal term used in spectrum analyzers and EMI / EMC testing
 Rainbow Group (1984–1989), a political group of the European Parliament
 Rainbow Group (1989–1994), a political group of the European Parliament
 RBW, a South Korean entertainment company